This is a list of settlements in Achaea, Greece:

 Achaiko
 Agia Marina
 Agia Varvara, Akrata
 Agia Varvara, Tritaia
 Agios Konstantinos
 Agios Nikolaos Kralis
 Agios Nikolaos Spaton
 Agios Nikolaos
 Agios Stefanos (Peristera)
 Agios Stefanos Saravaliou
 Agios Vasileios
 Agiovlasitika
 Agrampela
 Agridi
 Agrilia
 Aigeira
 Aiges
 Aigio
 Akrata
 Aktaio
 Alestaina
 Alissos
 Alepochori
 Alsos
 Ampelokipoi
 Ampelos
 Amygdalea
 Anastasi
 Ano Achaia
 Ano Diakopto
 Ano Katsaiteika
 Ano Kastritsi
 Ano Kleitoria
 Ano Lousoi
 Ano Mazaraki
 Ano Soudenaiika
 Ano Thomeika
 Ano Vlasia
 Ano Zachlorou
 Apideonas
 Arachovitika
 Araxos
 Argyra
 Arla
 Armpounas
 Aroania
 Arravonitsa
 Avgereika
 Chaikali
 Chalandritsa
 Charavgi
 Chatzis
 Chiona
 Chovoli
 Chrysanthio
 Chrysopigi
 Dafnes
 Dafni
 Damakini
 Demesticha
 Desino
 Diakopto
 Didacheika
 Digeliotika
 Dimitropoulo
 Doukanaiika
 Doumena
 Drepano
 Drosato
 Drosia
 Drymos
 Elaiochori
 Elaionas
 Elekistra
 Eliki
 Elliniko
 Erymantheia
 Exochi
 Fares
 Filia
 Flampoura
 Fostaina
 Fragka
 Galanaiika
 Gkaneika
 Gkraika
 Glastra
 Goumenissa
 Grigori
 Isoma
 Kagkadi
 Kalamaki (Charmpileika)
 Kalamias
 Kalanistra
 Kalanos
 Kalavryta
 Kalentzi 
 Kalfas
 Kallifoni
 Kallithea
 Kalousi
 Kamares
 Kamenianoi
 Kaminia
 Kandalos
 Kareika
 Kastelli
 Kastria
 Katarraktis
 Katholiko
 Kato Achaia
 Kato Alissos
 Kato Kastritsi
 Kato Katsaiteika
 Kato Lousoi
 Kato Mazaraki
 Kato Thomeika
 Kato Vlasia
 Kato Zachlorou
 Kerpini
 Kertezi
 Keryneia
 Kleitor
 Kleitoria
 Komi
 Korfes
 Kouloura
 Koumari
 Kouneleika
 Kounina
 Kouteli
 Krathio
 Krini Aigaleias
 Krini
 Krinofyta
 Krinos
 Kritharakia
 Kryoneri
 Krystallovrysi
 Lagovouni
 Lakka
 Lakkomata
 Lakkopetra
 Lapanagoi
 Lechouri
 Lefkasio
 Leontio 
 Limnochori
 Livartzi 
 Longos
 Lousika
 Lykouria
 Mageiras
 Mamousia
 Manesi Patron
 Manesi
 Mataragka
 Mavriki
 Melissia
 Mesorrougi
 Metochi
 Michoi
 Mikros Pontias
 Mintilogli
 Mirali
 Mitopoli
 Moira
 Monastiri
 Monodendri
 Myrovrysi
 Myrtos
 Nasia
 Neo Kompigadi
 Neo Souli
 Neos Erineos
 Nerantzies
 Niforeika
 Nikolaiika
 Oasi
 Ovrya
 Pangrati
 Paos
 Paralia Platanou
 Paralia
 Paraskevi
 Patras 
 Pefko
 Peristera (Agios Stefanos)
 Peristera Kalavryton
 Perithori
 Petas
 Petrochori
 Petroto
 Petsakoi
 Pititsa
 Plaka
 Planitero
 Platani
 Plataniotissa
 Platanos
 Platanovrysi
 Poimenochori (Boudoureika)
 Porovitsa
 Portes
 Priolithos
 Profitis Ilias
 Psathopyrgos
 Psofida
 Pteri
 Rakita
 Rio
 Riolos
 Rizomylos
 Rodia
 Rododafni
 Rogoi
 Roitika
 Roupakia
 Sageika 
 Salmeniko
 Santomeri
 Saravali
 Seires 
 Seliana
 Selianitika
 Selinountas
 Sella
 Sigouni
 Sinevro
 Skepasto
 Skiadas
 Skotani
 Skouras
 Souvalioteika
 Souvardo
 Spartia
 Starochori
 Stasi Kerpinis (Rallia)
 Stavrodromi
 Sylivainiotika
 Temeni
 Thea
 Theriano
 Toumpa
 Tourlada
 Trapeza
 Trechlo
 Tsoukalaiika
 Valimi
 Valimitika
 Valta
 Vasiliko
 Vela
 Velimachi
 Velitses
 Verino
 Vilivina
 Voutsimos
 Vrachnaiika
 Vrachni 
 Zachloritika
 Zarouchla
 Ziria
 Zisimeika

By municipality

See also
List of towns and villages in Greece

Achaea